Virtua Tennis 2, known as Tennis 2K2 in North America and  in Japan, is a sequel to Virtua Tennis that was released for the Sega Dreamcast, Sega NAOMI arcade unit and Sony's PlayStation 2 (known as Sega Sports Tennis in North America) in 2001-2002. New features included the ability to slice and play as female players such as Monica Seles, Serena Williams, Venus Williams and Lindsay Davenport and the males such as Patrick Rafter, Magnus Norman, Thomas Enqvist and Carlos Moya and mixed doubles matches. The game was created and produced by Hitmaker, with Acclaim Entertainment publishing it in Europe for the PS2. This was the last Virtua Tennis game to be released for the Dreamcast following its discontinuation.

Game modes

Tournament
The player must win 5 matches played on different surfaces and venues to win a tournament. If the player performs well enough, he is challenged by either King or Queen, the game's bosses, depending whether the selected player is male or female.

Exhibition
This is a single match in which the options are customizable.

World Tour
This is the main mode of the game. For the first time in the Virtua Tennis series, the World Tour mode features yearly based and calendarized seasons. Users have to play and win tournaments throughout the seasons, as well as to complete training exercises, in order to progress. Also, unlike any other game in the series, the World Tour mode on Virtua Tennis 2 requires the user to play and train both a male and a female players simultaneously, who can also team up to play in mixed doubles tournaments. The user enters with a rank of 300th for both male and female players, which improves as matches and tournaments are won. In addition, the players' abilities can be improved by completing different training exercises. The focus of the training exercises are to be fun, rather than realistic. Each exercise has four levels, with the difficulty increasing progressively. By completing the hardest difficulty with a certain amount of time left or points scored, an outfit is unlocked, which players can wear in all modes.

Game Content

Playable Characters

  Patrick Rafter
  Tim Henman
  Cedric Pioline
  Yevgeny Kafelnikov
  Tommy Haas
  Thomas Enqvist
  Magnus Norman
  Carlos Moyá

  Venus Williams
  Serena Williams
  Lindsay Davenport
  Monica Seles
  Mary Pierce
  Arantxa Sánchez-Vicario
  Jelena Dokic
  Alexandra Stevenson

SPT World Championships Tour Competitions
  London, Great Britain
  Melbourne, Australia
  New York, USA
  Paris, France
  Tokyo, Japan

Reception

The Dreamcast version received "universal acclaim", while the PlayStation 2 version received "favorable" reviews, according to the review aggregation website Metacritic. In Japan, Famitsu gave the former console version a score of 31 out of 40.

In Japan, Game Machine listed Virtua Tennis 2 on their December 1, 2001 issue as being the seventh most-successful arcade game of the month.

References

External links

2001 video games
Arcade video games
Dreamcast games
PlayStation 2 games
Sega-AM3 games
Sega arcade games
Sega video games
Virtua Tennis
Tennis video games
Video games developed in Japan